Kaptur is a surname. Notable people with the surname include:

Éva Kaptur (born 1987), Hungarian athlete
Hugh M. Kaptur (born 1931), American architect 
Marcy Kaptur (born 1946), American politician
Vadim Kaptur (born 1987), Belarusian diver